Qaleh-ye Naveh Kesh (also Romanized as Qal‘eh-ye Nāveh Kesh) is a village in Shurab Rural District, Veysian District, Dowreh County, Lorestan Province, Iran. At the 2006 census, its population was 31, in 7 families.

References 

Towns and villages in Dowreh County